This is a complete list of Scottish Statutory Instruments in 2014.

1-100 

 The Police Service of Scotland (Amendment) Regulations 2014 (S.S.I. 2014 No. 1)
 The Sea Fish (Prohibited Methods of Fishing) (Firth of Clyde) Order 2014 (S.S.I. 2014 No. 2)
 The Water and Sewerage Services to Dwellings (Collection of Unmetered Charges by Local Authority) (Scotland) Order 2014 (S.S.I. 2014 No. 3)
 The Environmental Protection (Duty of Care) (Scotland) Regulations 2014 (S.S.I. 2014 No. 4)
 The Sports Grounds and Sporting Events (Designation) (Scotland) Order 2014 (S.S.I. 2014 No. 5)
 The Common Agricultural Policy Schemes (Cross-Compliance) (Scotland) Amendment Regulations 2014 (revoked) (S.S.I. 2014 No. 6)
 The Less Favoured Area Support Scheme (Scotland) Amendment Regulations 2014 (S.S.I. 2014 No. 7)
 The Long Leases (Appeal Period) (Scotland) Order 2014 (S.S.I. 2014 No. 8)
 The Long Leases (Prescribed Form of Notices etc.) (Scotland) Regulations 2014 (S.S.I. 2014 No. 9)
 The A90 Trunk Road (Northbound Slip Road from B980 Castlandhill Road) (Temporary Prohibition on Use of Road and Temporary Speed Restrictions) Order 2014 (S.S.I. 2014 No. 10)
 The A9 Trunk Road (Blair Atholl Junction) (Temporary Prohibition on Use of Road) Order 2014 (S.S.I. 2014 No. 11)
 The Infant Formula and Follow-on Formula (Scotland) Amendment Regulations 2014 (S.S.I. 2014 No. 12)
 The Discontinuance of Aberdeen and Peterhead Prisons (Scotland) Order 2014 (S.S.I. 2014 No. 13)
 Act of Sederunt (Fees of Solicitors in the Sheriff Court) (Amendment) 2014 (S.S.I. 2014 No. 14)
 Act of Sederunt (Rules of the Court of Session Amendment) (Fees of Solicitors) 2014 (S.S.I. 2014 No. 15)
 The A9 Trunk Road (Kessock Bridge) (Temporary Prohibition of Specified Turns, Width Restriction and Use of Specified Lanes) Order 2014 (S.S.I. 2014 No. 16)
 The South East Scotland Trunk Roads (Temporary Prohibitions of Traffic and Overtaking and Temporary Speed Restrictions) (No. 1) Order 2014 (S.S.I. 2014 No. 17)
 The South West Scotland Trunk Roads (Temporary Prohibitions of Traffic and Overtaking and Temporary Speed Restrictions) (No. 1) Order 2014 (S.S.I. 2014 No. 18)
 The North East Scotland Trunk Roads (Temporary Prohibitions of Traffic and Overtaking and Temporary Speed Restrictions) (No. 1) Order 2014 (S.S.I. 2014 No. 19)
 The North West Scotland Trunk Roads (Temporary Prohibitions of Traffic and Overtaking and Temporary Speed Restrictions) (No. 1) Order 2014 (S.S.I. 2014 No. 20)
The Post-16 Education (Scotland) Act 2013 (Commencement No. 3 and Transitory and Savings Provisions) Order 2014  (S.S.I. 2014 No. 21 (C. 1))
The Designation of Regional Colleges (Scotland) Order 2014  (S.S.I. 2014 No. 22)
The Local Government Pension Scheme (Miscellaneous Amendments) (Scotland) Regulations 2014 (S.S.I. 2014 No. 23)
The Lands Tribunal for Scotland Amendment (Fees) Rules 2014 (S.S.I. 2014 No. 24)
The Self-directed Support (Direct Payments) (Scotland) Regulations 2014 (S.S.I. 2014 No. 25)
The Prisons and Young Offenders Institutions (Scotland) Amendment Rules 2014 (S.S.I. 2014 No. 26)
The A85 Trunk Road (Stafford Street, Oban) (Detrunking) Order 2014 (S.S.I. 2014 No. 27)
The Non-Domestic Rate (Scotland) Order 2014 (S.S.I. 2014 No. 28)
Act of Sederunt (Messengers-at-Arms and Sheriff Officers Rules) (Amendment) 2014 (S.S.I. 2014 No. 29)
The Non-Domestic Rates (Levying) (Scotland) Regulations 2014 (S.S.I. 2014 No. 30)
The Non-Domestic Rating (Unoccupied Property) (Scotland) Amendment Regulations 2014 (S.S.I. 2014 No. 31)
The Social Care (Self-directed Support) (Scotland) Act 2013 (Commencement, Transitional and Saving Provisions) Order 2014 (S.S.I. 2013 No. 32 (C. 2))
The Protection of Vulnerable Groups (Scotland) Act 2007 (Miscellaneous Provisions) Amendment Order 2014 (S.S.I. 2014 No. 33)
The Prisons (Interference with Wireless Telegraphy) Act 2012 (Commencement) (Scotland) Order 2014 (S.S.I. 2014 No. 34 (C. 3))
The Council Tax Reduction (Scotland) Amendment Regulations 2014 (S.S.I. 2014 No. 35)
The Local Government Finance (Scotland) Order 2014  (S.S.I. 2014 No. 36)
The Council Tax (Discounts) (Scotland) Amendment Order 2014  (S.S.I. 2014 No. 37)
The National Assistance (Assessment of Resources) Amendment (Scotland) Regulations 2014  (S.S.I. 2014 No. 38)
The National Assistance (Sums for Personal Requirements) (Scotland) Regulations 2014  (S.S.I. 2014 No. 39)
The Home Energy Assistance Scheme (Scotland) Amendment Regulations 2014  (S.S.I. 2014 No. 40)
The Land Registration etc. (Scotland) Act 2012 (Commencement No. 2 and Transitional Provisions) Order 2014  (S.S.I. 2014 No. 41 (C. 4))
The HIV Testing Kits and Services Revocation (Scotland) Regulations 2014 (S.S.I. 2014 No. 42)
The National Health Service (Superannuation Scheme) (Scotland) Amendment Regulations 2014  (S.S.I. 2014 No. 43)
The Teachers’ Superannuation (Scotland) Amendment Regulations 2014 (S.S.I. 2014 No. 44)
The South West Scotland Trunk Roads (Temporary Prohibitions of Traffic and Overtaking and Temporary Speed Restrictions) (No. 2) Order 2014 (S.S.I. 2014 No. 45)
 The South East Scotland Trunk Roads (Temporary Prohibitions of Traffic and Overtaking and Temporary Speed Restrictions) (No. 2) Order 2014
 (S.S.I. 2014 No. 46)
The North West Scotland Trunk Roads (Temporary Prohibitions of Traffic and Overtaking and Temporary Speed Restrictions) (No. 2) Order 2014 (S.S.I. 2014 No. 47)
The North East Scotland Trunk Roads (Temporary Prohibitions of Traffic and Overtaking and Temporary Speed Restrictions) (No. 2) Order 2014  (S.S.I. 2014 No. 48)
The Proceeds of Crime Act 2002 (Disclosure of Information to and by Lord Advocate and Scottish Ministers) Amendment Order 2014  (S.S.I. 2014 No. 49)
The Ethical Standards in Public Life etc. (Scotland) Act 2000 (Register of Interests) Amendment Regulations 2014 (S.S.I. 2014 No. 50)
The Town and Country Planning (Hazardous Substances) (Scotland) Amendment Regulations 2014 (revoked) (S.S.I. 2014 No. 51)
The Coatbridge College (Transfer and Closure) (Scotland) Order 2014 (S.S.I. 2014 No. 52)
The Town and Country Planning (Tree Preservation Order and Trees in Conservation Areas) (Scotland) Amendment Regulations 2014 (S.S.I. 2014 No. 53)
The High Hedges (Scotland) Act 2013 (Commencement) Order 2014 (S.S.I. 2014 No. 54 (C. 5))
The High Hedges (Scotland) Act 2013 (Supplementary Provision) Order 2014 (S.S.I. 2014 No. 55)
The Road Works (Inspection Fees) (Scotland) Amendment Regulations 2014  (S.S.I. 2014 No. 56)
The Personal Injuries (NHS Charges) (Amounts) (Scotland) Amendment Regulations 2014 (S.S.I. 2014 No. 57)
The Scottish Road Works Register (Prescribed Fees) Regulations 2014 (S.S.I. 2014 No. 58)
The Firemen’s Pension Scheme (Amendment) (Scotland) Order 2014 (S.S.I. 2014 No. 59)
The Firefighters’ Pension Scheme (Scotland) Amendment Order 2014 (S.S.I. 2014 No. 60)
The National Health Service (Optical Charges and Payments) (Scotland) Amendment Regulations 2014 (S.S.I. 2014 No. 61)
The Police Pensions (Contributions) Amendment (Scotland) Regulations 2014 (S.S.I. 2014 No. 62)
The Brucellosis (Scotland) Amendment Order 2014 (S.S.I. 2014 No. 63)
The Non-Domestic Rating (Valuation of Utilities) (Scotland) Amendment Order 2014 (S.S.I. 2014 No. 64)
The Carers (Waiving of Charges for Support) (Scotland) Regulations 2014 (S.S.I. 2014 No. 65)
The Community Care (Joint Working etc.) (Scotland) Amendment Regulations 2014 (S.S.I. 2014 No. 66)
The Police Service of Scotland (Performance) Regulations 2014 (S.S.I. 2014 No. 67)
The Police Service of Scotland (Conduct) Regulations 2014 (S.S.I. 2014 No. 68)
The Teachers’ Superannuation (Scotland) (Miscellaneous Amendments) Regulations 2014 (S.S.I. 2014 No. 69)
The National Health Service (Charges to Overseas Visitors) (Scotland) (Amendment) Regulations 2014 (S.S.I. 2014 No. 70)
The Tuberculosis (Scotland) Amendment Order 2014 (S.S.I. 2014 No. 71)
The Brucellosis (Scotland) Amendment (No. 2) Order 2014 (S.S.I. 2014 No. 72)
The National Health Service (Physiotherapist, Podiatrist or Chiropodist Independent Prescribers) (Miscellaneous Amendments) (Scotland) Regulations 2014 (S.S.I. 2014 No. 73)
The Local Government Finance (Scotland) Amendment Order 2014  (S.S.I. 2014 No. 74)
The North East Scotland Trunk Roads (Temporary Prohibitions of Traffic and Overtaking and Temporary Speed Restrictions) (No. 3) Order 2014 (S.S.I. 2014 No. 75)
The North West Scotland Trunk Roads (Temporary Prohibitions of Traffic and Overtaking and Temporary Speed Restrictions) (No. 3) Order 2014  (S.S.I. 2014 No. 76)
The South East Scotland Trunk Roads (Temporary Prohibitions of Traffic and Overtaking and Temporary Speed Restrictions) (No. 3) Order 2014  (S.S.I. 2014 No. 77)
The South West Scotland Trunk Roads (Temporary Prohibitions of Traffic and Overtaking and Temporary Speed Restrictions) (No. 3) Order 2014  (S.S.I. 2014 No. 78)
The Post-16 Education (Scotland) Act 2013 (Commencement No. 4 and Transitory Provisions) Order 2014 (S.S.I. 2014 No. 79 (C. 6))
The Assigned Colleges (Scotland) Order 2014 (S.S.I. 2014 No. 80)
The Budget (Scotland) Act 2013 Amendment Order 2014 (S.S.I. 2014 No. 81)
The M9/A9 Trunk Road (Aberuthven to Findo Gask) (Temporary Prohibition of Specified Turns) Order 2014 (S.S.I. 2014 No. 82)
The Electronic Documents (Scotland) Regulations 2014 (S.S.I. 2014 No. 83)
The Road Traffic (Permitted Parking Area and Special Parking Area) (Argyll and Bute Council) Designation Order 2014  (S.S.I. 2014 No. 84)
The Parking Attendants (Wearing of Uniforms) (Argyll and Bute Council Parking Area) Regulations 2014  (S.S.I. 2014 No. 85)
The Road Traffic (Parking Adjudicators) (Argyll and Bute Council) Regulations 2014 (S.S.I. 2014 No. 86)
 Not Allocated (S.S.I. 2014 No. 87) 
 Not Allocated (S.S.I. 2014 No. 88) 
 Not Allocated (S.S.I. 2014 No. 89) 
The Social Care (Self-directed Support) (Scotland) Act 2013 (Consequential and Saving Provisions) Order 2014 (S.S.I. 2014 No. 90)
The Community Care (Personal Care and Nursing Care) (Scotland) Amendment Regulations 2014 (S.S.I. 2014 No. 91)
The Glasgow Commonwealth Games Act 2008 (Duration of Urgent Traffic Regulation Measures) Order 2014 (S.S.I. 2014 No. 92)
The Patient Rights (Treatment Time Guarantee) (Scotland) Amendment Regulations 2014 (S.S.I. 2014 No. 93)
The Renewables Obligation (Scotland) Amendment Order 2014  (S.S.I. 2014 No. 94)
The Right to Interpretation and Translation in Criminal Proceedings (Scotland) Regulations 2014  (S.S.I. 2014 No. 95)
The A887 Trunk Road (Torgoyle) (50mph Speed Limit) Order 2014 (S.S.I. 2014 No. 96)
The A8 Trunk Road (Bogston to Newark, Port Glasgow) (40mph Speed Limit) Order 2014  (S.S.I. 2014 No. 97)
The Agricultural Holdings (Scotland) Act 2003 Remedial Order 2014  (S.S.I. 2014 No. 98)
Act of Sederunt (Fitness for Judicial Office Tribunal Rules) 2014  (S.S.I. 2014 No. 99)
The National Health Service (Functions of the Common Services Agency) (Scotland) Amendment Order 2014  (S.S.I. 2014 No. 100)

101-200 

The Scottish Independence Referendum (Chief Counting Officer and Counting Officer Charges and Expenses) Order 2014 (S.S.I. 2014 No. 101)
Act of Sederunt (Fitness for Judicial Office Tribunal Rules) (No. 2) 2014 (S.S.I. 2014 No. 102)
The Additional Support for Learning (Sources of Information) (Scotland) Amendment Order 2014 (S.S.I. 2014 No. 103)
The South East Scotland Trunk Roads (Temporary Prohibitions of Traffic and Overtaking and Temporary Speed Restrictions) (No. 4) Order 2014 (S.S.I. 2014 No. 104)
The South West Scotland Trunk Roads (Temporary Prohibitions of Traffic and Overtaking and Temporary Speed Restrictions) (No. 4) Order 2014 (S.S.I. 2014 No. 105)
The North East Scotland Trunk Roads (Temporary Prohibitions of Traffic and Overtaking and Temporary Speed Restrictions) (No. 4) Order 2014 (S.S.I. 2014 No. 106)
The North West Scotland Trunk Roads (Temporary Prohibitions of Traffic and Overtaking and Temporary Speed Restrictions) (No. 4) Order 2014 (S.S.I. 2014 No. 107)
The Firemen’s Pension Scheme (Amendment No. 2) (Scotland) Order 2014 (S.S.I. 2014 No. 108)
The Firefighters’ Compensation Scheme (Scotland) Amendment Order 2014 (S.S.I. 2014 No. 109)
The Firefighters’ Pension Scheme (Scotland) Amendment (No. 2) Order 2014 (S.S.I. 2014 No. 110)
The Marketing of Vegetable Plant Material Amendment (Scotland) Regulations 2014 (S.S.I. 2014 No. 111)
The Children’s Hearings (Scotland) Act 2011 (Modification of Subordinate Legislation) Order 2014 (S.S.I. 2014 No. 112)
The Adoption and Children (Scotland) Act 2007 (Compulsory Supervision Order Reports in Applications for Permanence Orders) Regulations 2014 (S.S.I. 2014 No. 113)
The Insolvency (Scotland) Amendment Rules 2014 (S.S.I. 2014 No. 114)
The National Health Service (Free Prescriptions and Charges for Drugs and Appliances) (Scotland) Amendment Regulations 2014 (S.S.I. 2014 No. 115)
The Young People’s Involvement in Education and Training (Provision of Information) (Scotland) Order 2014 (S.S.I. 2014 No. 116)
The Victims and Witnesses (Scotland) Act 2014 (Commencement No. 1) Order 2014 (S.S.I. 2014 No. 117 (C. 7))
The Food Hygiene (Scotland) Amendment Regulations 2014 (S.S.I. 2014 No. 118)
Act of Sederunt (Rules of the Court of Session and Sheriff Court Company Insolvency Rules Amendment) (Miscellaneous) 2014 (S.S.I. 2014 No. 119)
The A85 Trunk Road (Dunollie Road) (Temporary Prohibition on Use of Road) Order 2014 (S.S.I. 2014 No. 120)
The Marriage and Civil Partnership (Scotland) Act 2014 (Commencement No. 1) Order 2014 (S.S.I. 2014 No. 121 (C. 8))
The Plant Health (Forestry) (Phytophthora ramorum Management Zone) (Scotland) Order 2014 (S.S.I. 2014 No. 122)
The Adults with Incapacity (Supervision of Welfare Guardians etc. by Local Authorities) (Scotland) Amendment Regulations 2014 (S.S.I. 2014 No. 123)
The M77/A77 Trunk Road (Vicarton Street, Girvan) (Temporary Prohibitions of Traffic and Overtaking and Temporary Speed Restrictions) Order 2014 (S.S.I. 2014 No. 124)
The A99 Trunk Road (Thrumster) (50mph Speed Limit) Order 2014  (S.S.I. 2014 No. 125)
The A7 Trunk Road (Broadhaugh) (50mph Speed Limit) Order 2014 (S.S.I. 2014 No. 126)
The Land Registration etc. (Scotland) Act 2012 (Designated Day) Order 2014 (S.S.I. 2014 No. 127)
The A92/A972 Trunk Road (B969 Western Avenue to the C49 leading to Star) (Temporary Prohibition of Specified Turns) Order 2014 (S.S.I. 2014 No. 128)
The Regulation of Care (Social Service Workers) (Scotland) Amendment Order 2014 (S.S.I. 2014 No. 129)
The Title Conditions (Scotland) Act 2003 (Rural Housing Bodies) Amendment Order 2014 (S.S.I. 2014 No. 130)
The Children and Young People (Scotland) Act 2014 (Commencement No. 1 and Transitory Provisions) Order 2014 (S.S.I. 2014 No. 131 (C. 9))
The Children and Young People (Scotland) Act 2014 (Ancillary Provision) Order 2014 (S.S.I. 2014 No. 132)
The South East Scotland Trunk Roads (Temporary Prohibitions of Traffic and Overtaking and Temporary Speed Restrictions) (No. 5) Order 2014 (S.S.I. 2014 No. 133)
The North East Scotland Trunk Roads (Temporary Prohibitions of Traffic and Overtaking and Temporary Speed Restrictions) (No. 5) Order 2014 (S.S.I. 2014 No. 134)
The South West Scotland Trunk Roads (Temporary Prohibitions of Traffic and Overtaking and Temporary Speed Restrictions) (No. 5) Order 2014 (S.S.I. 2014 No. 135)
The North West Scotland Trunk Roads (Temporary Prohibitions of Traffic and Overtaking and Temporary Speed Restrictions) (No. 5) Order 2014 (S.S.I. 2014 No. 136)
The Children’s Hearings (Scotland) Act 2011 (Supplementary Provision) Order 2014 (S.S.I. 2014 No. 137)
The M9/A9 Trunk Road (Aberuthven to Findo Gask) (Temporary Prohibition of Specified Turns) (No 2) Order 2014 (S.S.I. 2014 No. 138)
The Town and Country Planning (Control of Advertisements) (Scotland) Amendment Regulations 2014 (S.S.I. 2014 No. 139)
The Plant Health (Scotland) Amendment Order 2014 (revoked) (S.S.I. 2014 No. 140)
The Registration of Births, Still-births, Deaths and Marriages (Prescription of Forms) (Scotland) Amendment Regulations 2014 (S.S.I. 2014 No. 141)
The Town and Country Planning (General Permitted Development) (Scotland) Amendment Order 2014 (S.S.I. 2014 No. 142)
The St Mary’s Music School (Aided Places) (Scotland) Amendment Regulations 2014 (S.S.I. 2014 No. 143)
The Post-16 Education (Scotland) Act 2013 (Commencement No. 5) Order 2014 (S.S.I. 2014 No. 144 (C. 10))
The Disabled Persons (Badges for Motor Vehicles) (Scotland) Amendment Regulations 2014 (S.S.I. 2014 No. 145)
The Assigned Colleges (University of the Highlands and Islands) Order 2014 (S.S.I. 2014 No. 146)
The Sexual Offences Act 2003 (Prescribed Police Stations) (Scotland) Regulations 2014 (S.S.I. 2014 No. 147)
The National Health Service (Pharmaceutical Services) (Scotland) (Miscellaneous Amendments) Regulations 2014 (S.S.I. 2014 No. 148)
The Firefighters’ Pension Scheme (Scotland) Amendment (No. 3) Order 2014 (S.S.I. 2014 No. 149)
The Land Register Rules etc. (Scotland) Regulations 2014 (S.S.I. 2014 No. 150)
The Specified Diseases (Notification and Slaughter) (Amendment) and Compensation (Scotland) Order 2014 (S.S.I. 2014 No. 151)
Act of Sederunt (Rules of the Court of Session, Ordinary Cause Rules and Summary Cause Rules Amendment) (Miscellaneous) 2014 (S.S.I. 2014 No. 152)
The Valuation and Rating (Exempted Classes) (Scotland) Order 2014 (S.S.I. 2014 No. 153)
The National Health Service Superannuation Scheme (Scotland) (Miscellaneous Amendments) Regulations 2014 (S.S.I. 2014 No. 154)
The Judicial Pensions and Retirement Act 1993 (Part-time Sheriff, Stipendiary Magistrate and Justice of the Peace) Order 2014 (S.S.I. 2014 No. 155)
The A90 Trunk Road (Temporary Northbound Slip Road to Ferrytoll Roundabout) (Temporary Prohibition of Overtaking and Temporary Speed Restrictions) Order 2014 (S.S.I. 2014 No. 156)
The Adults with Incapacity (Supervision of Welfare Guardians etc. by Local Authorities) (Scotland) Amendment (No. 2) Regulations 2014 (S.S.I. 2014 No. 157)
The Pennan Harbour Revision Order 2014 (S.S.I. 2014 No. 158)
The Right to Information (Suspects and Accused Persons) (Scotland) Regulations 2014 (S.S.I. 2014 No. 159)
The Regulatory Reform (Scotland) Act 2014 (Commencement No. 1 and Transitional Provision) Order 2014 (S.S.I. 2014 No. 160 (C. 11))
The Single Use Carrier Bags Charge (Scotland) Regulations 2014 (S.S.I. 2014 No. 161)
Act of Adjournal (Criminal Procedure Rules Amendment) (Regulatory Reform (Scotland) Act 2014) 2014 (S.S.I. 2014 No. 162)
 Not Allocated (S.S.I. 2014 No. 163)
The Local Government Pension Scheme (Scotland) Regulations 2014 (S.S.I. 2014 No. 164)
The Children and Young People (Scotland) Act 2014 (Commencement No. 2, Transitional and Transitory Provisions) Order 2014 (S.S.I. 2014 No. 165 (C. 12))
The Harbour Authority Designation (Scotland) Order 2014 (S.S.I. 2014 No. 166)
The Seed (Fees) (Scotland) Regulations 2014 (S.S.I. 2014 No. 167)
The A68 Trunk Road (Edinburgh Road, Jedburgh) (Temporary Prohibition on Waiting and 30mph Speed Limit) Order 2014 (S.S.I. 2014 No. 168)
The Road Traffic (Permitted Parking Area and Special Parking Area) (Inverclyde Council) Designation Order 2014 (S.S.I. 2014 No. 169)
The Parking Attendants (Wearing of Uniforms) (Inverclyde Council Parking Area) Regulations 2014 (S.S.I. 2014 No. 170)
The Road Traffic (Parking Adjudicators) (Inverclyde Council) Regulations 2014 (S.S.I. 2014 No. 171)
The Bankruptcy and Debt Advice (Scotland) Act 2014 (Commencement No. 1 and Saving) Order 2014 (S.S.I. 2014 No. 172 (C. 13))
The Bankruptcy and Diligence etc. (Scotland) Act 2007 (Commencement No. 9 and Savings Amendment) Order 2014 (S.S.I. 2014 No. 173 (C. 14))
The M9/A9 Trunk Road (Gleneagles Railway Station to Millhill Farm) (Prohibition of Specified Turns) Order 2014 (S.S.I. 2014 No. 174)
The A83 Trunk Road (Poltalloch Street, Lochgilphead) (Temporary Prohibition On Use of Road) Order 2014 (S.S.I. 2014 No. 175)
The Aquaculture and Fisheries (Scotland) Act 2013 (Specification of Commercially Damaging Species) Order 2014 (S.S.I. 2014 No. 176)
The A82 Trunk Road (Pulpit Rock Improvement) (Temporary Prohibition of Traffic and Overtaking and Speed Restriction) Order 2014 (S.S.I. 2014 No. 177)
The South West Scotland Trunk Roads (Temporary Prohibitions of Traffic and Overtaking and Temporary Speed Restrictions) (No. 6) Order 2014 (S.S.I. 2014 No. 178)
The South East Scotland Trunk Roads (Temporary Prohibitions of Traffic and Overtaking and Temporary Speed Restrictions) (No. 6) Order 2014 (S.S.I. 2014 No. 179)
The North West Scotland Trunk Roads (Temporary Prohibitions of Traffic and Overtaking and Temporary Speed Restrictions) (No. 6) Order 2014 (S.S.I. 2014 No. 180)
The North East Scotland Trunk Roads (Temporary Prohibitions of Traffic and Overtaking and Temporary Speed Restrictions) (No. 6) Order 2014 (S.S.I. 2014 No. 181)
The A82 Trunk Road (Drumnadrochit to Fort Augustus) (Temporary Prohibition of Traffic) Order 2014 (S.S.I. 2014 No. 182)
The Tribunals (Scotland) Act 2014 (Commencement No. 1) Order 2014 (S.S.I. 2014 No. 183 (C. 15))
The Town and Country Planning (General Permitted Development) (Scotland) Amendment (Amendment) Order 2014 (S.S.I. 2014 No. 184)
The Protection of Seals (Designation of Haul-Out Sites) (Scotland) Order 2014 (S.S.I. 2014 No. 185)
 Not Allocated (S.S.I. 2014 No. 186)
The Proceeds of Crime Act 2002 (Amendment of Schedule 4) (Scotland) Order 2014 (S.S.I. 2014 No. 187)
The Registers of Scotland (Fees) Order 2014 (S.S.I. 2014 No. 188)
The Registers of Scotland (Information and Access) Order 2014 (S.S.I. 2014 No. 189)
The Land Registration etc. (Scotland) Act 2012 (Incidental, Consequential and Transitional) Order 2014 (S.S.I. 2014 No. 190)
The Public Appointments and Public Bodies etc. (Scotland) Act 2003 (Treatment of Revenue Scotland as Specified Authority) Order 2014 (S.S.I. 2014 No. 191)
The Registration of Social Workers and Social Service Workers in Care Services (Scotland) Amendment Regulations 2014 (S.S.I. 2014 No. 192)
The National Confidential Forum (Prescribed Care and Health Services) (Scotland) Order 2014 (revoked) (S.S.I. 2014 No. 193)
The Land Register of Scotland (Rate of Interest on Compensation) Regulations 2014 (S.S.I. 2014 No. 194)
The M90/A90 Trunk Road (Gairneybridge to Milnathort) (Temporary 50mph and 30mph Speed Restrictions) Order 2014  (S.S.I. 2014 No. 195)
The Provision of Early Learning and Childcare (Specified Children) (Scotland) Order 2014 (S.S.I. 2014 No. 196)
The M8 and M74 Trunk Roads (Games Lanes) Order 2014 (S.S.I. 2014 No. 197)
The A9 and A82 Trunk Roads (Kessock) (50mph Speed Limit) Order 2014 (S.S.I. 2014 No. 198)
The A68 Trunk Road (Bongate and Newcastle Road, Jedburgh) (Temporary Prohibition On Use of Road) Order 2014 (S.S.I. 2014 No. 199)
The Local Authority Accounts (Scotland) Regulations 2014 (S.S.I. 2014 No. 200)

201-300
 Act of Sederunt (Rules of the Court of Session and Sheriff Court Rules Amendment) (Miscellaneous) 2014 (S.S.I. 2014 No. 201)
The Public Bodies (Joint Working) (Scotland) Act 2014 (Commencement No. 1) Order 2014 (S.S.I. 2014 No. 202 (C. 16))
The A7 Trunk Road (High Street and Townhead, Langholm) (Temporary Prohibition On Use of Road) Order 2014 (S.S.I. 2014 No. 203)
The M898/A898 and A82 Trunk Roads (Erskine Bridge) (50mph Speed Limit) Order 2014 (S.S.I. 2014 No. 204)
The M73, M74 and A725 (Commonwealth Games Triathlon) (Temporary Speed Restriction) Order 2014 (S.S.I. 2014 No. 205)
The South East Scotland Trunk Roads (Temporary Prohibitions of Traffic and Overtaking and Temporary Speed Restrictions) (No. 7) Order 2014 (S.S.I. 2014 No. 206)
The South West Scotland Trunk Roads (Temporary Prohibitions of Traffic and Overtaking and Temporary Speed Restrictions) (No. 7) Order 2014 (S.S.I. 2014 No. 207)
The North West Scotland Trunk Roads (Temporary Prohibitions of Traffic and Overtaking and Temporary Speed Restrictions) (No. 7) Order 2014 (S.S.I. 2014 No. 208)
The North East Scotland Trunk Roads (Temporary Prohibitions of Traffic and Overtaking and Temporary Speed Restrictions) (No. 7) Order 2014 (S.S.I. 2014 No. 209)
The Victims and Witnesses (Scotland) Act 2014 (Commencement No. 2 and Transitional Provision) Order 2014 (S.S.I. 2014 No. 210 (C. 17))
The M8/A8 Trunk Road (Commonwealth Games Time Trial Event) (Temporary Prohibition On Use and Temporary Speed Restriction) Order 2014 (S.S.I. 2014 No. 211)
The Marriage and Civil Partnership (Scotland) Act 2014 (Commencement No. 2 and Saving Provisions) Order 2014 (S.S.I. 2014 No. 212  (C. 18))
 The Food Hygiene and Official Feed and Food Controls (Scotland) Amendment Regulations 2014 (S.S.I. 2014 No. 213)
The Town and Country Planning (Fees for Applications and Deemed Applications) (Scotland) Amendment Regulations 2014 (S.S.I. 2014 No. 214)
The A83 (Kennacraig to Campbeltown) (Trunking) Order 2014 (S.S.I. 2014 No. 215)
The A82 Trunk Road (Crianlarich Bypass) (Temporary Speed Restriction) Order 2014 (S.S.I. 2014 No. 216)
The Teachers’ Pension Scheme (Scotland) Regulations 2014 (S.S.I. 2014 No. 217)
The Marriage and Civil Partnership (Scotland) Act 2014 (Commencement No. 2 and Saving Provisions) Amendment Order 2014 (S.S.I. 2014 No. 218 (C. 19))
The Building (Scotland) Amendment Regulations 2014 (S.S.I. 2014 No. 219)
The Title Conditions (Scotland) Act 2003 (Rural Housing Bodies) Amendment (No. 2) Order 2014 (S.S.I. 2014 No. 220)
The Anti-social Behaviour, Crime and Policing Act 2014 (Commencement) (Scotland) Order 2014 (S.S.I. 2014 No. 221 (C. 20))
The A96 Trunk Road (Forres Bypass) (40mph Speed Limit) Order 2014 (S.S.I. 2014 No. 222)
The A9 Trunk Road (Munlochy Junction) (Temporary Prohibition of Specified Turns) Order 2014 (S.S.I. 2014 No. 223)
The Port of Ardersier Harbour Revision Order 2014 (S.S.I. 2014 No. 224)
The Bankruptcy (Scotland) Regulations 2014 (S.S.I. 2014 No. 225)
The Bankruptcy (Applications and Decisions) (Scotland) Regulations 2014 (S.S.I. 2014 No. 226)
The Bankruptcy Fees (Scotland) Regulations 2014 (S.S.I. 2014 No. 227)
The M90/A90 and A823(M) Trunk Roads (Inverkeithing to Masterton) (Temporary Prohibitions of Traffic and Pedestrians, Overtaking and Speed Restrictions) Order 2014 (S.S.I. 2014 No. 228)
The Rules of the Scottish Land Court Order 2014 (S.S.I. 2014 No. 229)
The Public Appointments and Public Bodies etc. (Scotland) Act 2003 (Treatment of the Convener of the School Closure Review Panels as Specified Authority) Order 2014 (S.S.I. 2014 No. 230)
The Public Bodies (Joint Working) (Scotland) Act 2014 (Commencement No. 2) Order 2014 (S.S.I. 2014 No. 231 (C. 21))
The Scottish Legal Complaints Commission (Modification of Duties and Powers) Regulations 2014 (S.S.I. 2014 No. 232)
The Local Government Pension Scheme (Transitional Provisions and Savings) (Scotland) Regulations 2014 (S.S.I. 2014 No. 233)
The North East Scotland Trunk Roads (Temporary Prohibitions of Traffic and Overtaking and Temporary Speed Restrictions) (No. 8) Order 2014 (S.S.I. 2014 No. 234)
The North West Scotland Trunk Roads (Temporary Prohibitions of Traffic and Overtaking and Temporary Speed Restrictions) (No. 8) Order 2014 (S.S.I. 2014 No. 235)
The South West Scotland Trunk Roads (Temporary Prohibitions of Traffic and Overtaking and Temporary Speed Restrictions) (No. 8) Order 2014 (S.S.I. 2014 No. 236)
The South East Scotland Trunk Roads (Temporary Prohibitions of Traffic and Overtaking and Temporary Speed Restrictions) (No. 8) Order 2014 (S.S.I. 2014 No. 237)
The M8 Special Road (Hillington Footbridge) Order 2014 (S.S.I. 2014 No. 238)
The Public Appointments and Public Bodies etc. (Scotland) Act 2003 (Treatment of Historic Environment Scotland as Specified Authority) Order 2014 (S.S.I. 2014 No. 239)
The M9/A9 and M90/A90 Trunk Roads (Ryder Cup) (Temporary Prohibition of Waiting and Specified Turns and Temporary 50mph and 30mph Speed Restrictions) Order 2014 (S.S.I. 2014 No. 240)
The M90/A90 Trunk Roads (Ferrytoll Junction to Admiralty) (Temporary 50mph Speed Restriction) Order 2014 (S.S.I. 2014 No. 241)
Act of Adjournal (Amendment of the Criminal Procedure (Scotland) Act 1995 and Criminal Procedure Rules 1996) (Miscellaneous) 2014 (S.S.I. 2014 No. 242)
The Homeless Persons (Unsuitable Accommodation) (Scotland) Order 2014 (S.S.I. 2014 No. 243)
The A84 Trunk Road (Callander) (Temporary Prohibition of Pedestrians and Waiting, Loading and Unloading) Order 2014 (S.S.I. 2014 No. 244)
The M90/A90 Trunk Road (Admiralty to Masterton) (Temporary Prohibitions of Traffic and Overtaking, and Speed Restrictions) Order 2014 (S.S.I. 2014 No. 245)
The A9 Trunk Road (Kincraig to Dalraddy) (Side Roads) Order 2014 (S.S.I. 2014 No. 246)
The A75 Trunk Road (Crocketford) (Restricted Road) Order 2014 (S.S.I. 2014 No. 247)
The A82 Trunk Road (Crianlarich Bypass) (Temporary Prohibition of Use) Order 2014 (S.S.I. 2014 No. 248)
The Town and Country Planning (Control of Advertisements) (Scotland) Amendment (No. 2) Regulations 2014 (S.S.I. 2014 No. 249)
The Lanarkshire Colleges Order 2014 (S.S.I. 2014 No. 250)
The Children and Young People (Scotland) Act 2014 (Commencement No. 3) Order 2014 (S.S.I. 2014 No. 251 (C. 22))
 Not Allocated (S.S.I. 2014 No. 252)
The South East Scotland Trunk Roads (Temporary Prohibitions of Traffic and Overtaking and Temporary Speed Restrictions) (No. 9) Order 2014 (S.S.I. 2014 No. 253)
The South West Scotland Trunk Roads (Temporary Prohibitions of Traffic and Overtaking and Temporary Speed Restrictions) (No. 9) Order 2014 (S.S.I. 2014 No. 254)
The North West Scotland Trunk Roads (Temporary Prohibitions of Traffic and Overtaking and Temporary Speed Restrictions) (No. 9) Order 2014 (S.S.I. 2014 No. 255)
The North East Scotland Trunk Roads (Temporary Prohibitions of Traffic and Overtaking and Temporary Speed Restrictions) (No. 9) Order 2014 (S.S.I. 2014 No. 256)
The Legal Aid and Assistance By Way of Representation (Fees for Time at Court and Travelling) (Scotland) Regulations 2014 (S.S.I. 2014 No. 257)
The Sulphur Content of Liquid Fuels (Scotland) Regulations 2014 (S.S.I. 2014 No. 258)
The M74 Trunk Road (Raith) (Temporary Prohibition of Use) Order 2014 (S.S.I. 2014 No. 259)
The South Arran Marine Conservation Order 2014 (S.S.I. 2014 No. 260)
The Bankruptcy and Debt Advice (Scotland) Act 2014 (Commencement No. 2, Savings and Transitionals) Order 2014 (S.S.I. 2014 No. 261 (C. 23))
The Convener of the School Closure Review Panels (Scotland) Regulations 2014 (S.S.I. 2014 No. 262)
The Members of a School Closure Review Panel (Scotland) Regulations 2014 (S.S.I. 2014 No. 263)
The Housing (Scotland) Act 2014 (Commencement No. 1, Transitional and Saving Provisions) Order 2014 (S.S.I. 2014 No. 264 (C. 24))
Act of Sederunt (Commissary Business) (Amendment) 2014 (S.S.I. 2014 No. 265)
The A8 Trunk Road (Chapelhall) (Temporary Prohibition on Use of Road) Order 2014 (S.S.I. 2014 No. 266)
The Pollution Prevention and Control (Scotland) Amendment Regulations 2014 (S.S.I. 2014 No. 267)
The Royal Conservatoire of Scotland Order of Council 2014 (S.S.I. 2014 No. 268)
The A78 Trunk Road (Gallowgate Street, Largs) (Prohibition of Waiting, Loading and Unloading) Order 2014 (S.S.I. 2014 No. 269)
The South East Scotland Trunk Roads (Temporary Prohibitions of Traffic and Overtaking and Temporary Speed Restrictions) (No. 10) Order 2014 (S.S.I. 2014 No. 270)
The South West Scotland Trunk Roads (Temporary Prohibitions of Traffic and Overtaking and Temporary Speed Restrictions) (No. 10) Order 2014 (S.S.I. 2014 No. 271)
The Legal Profession and Legal Aid (Scotland) Act 2007 (Membership of the Scottish Legal Complaints Commission) Amendment Order 2014 (S.S.I. 2014 No. 272)
The North West Scotland Trunk Roads (Temporary Prohibitions of Traffic and Overtaking and Temporary Speed Restrictions) (No. 10) Order 2014 (S.S.I. 2014 No. 273)
The HGV Speed Limit (M9/A9 Trunk Road) Regulations 2014 (S.S.I. 2014 No. 274)
The North East Scotland Trunk Roads (Temporary Prohibitions of Traffic and Overtaking and Temporary Speed Restrictions) (No. 10) Order 2014 (S.S.I. 2014 No. 275)
The A82 Trunk Road (Crianlarich Bypass) (Temporary Prohibition of Use and Speed Restriction) Order 2014 (S.S.I. 2014 No. 276)
The Landfill Tax (Scotland) Act 2014 (Commencement No. 1) Order 2014 (S.S.I. 2014 No. 277 (C. 25))
The Revenue Scotland and Tax Powers Act 2014 (Commencement No. 1) Order 2014 (S.S.I. 2014 No. 278 (C. 26))
The Land and Buildings Transaction Tax (Scotland) Act 2013 (Commencement No. 1) Order 2014 (S.S.I. 2014 No. 279 (C. 27))
The A96 Trunk Road (Church Road, Keith) (Temporary Prohibition on Use of Road) Order 2014 (S.S.I. 2014 No. 280)
The Public Bodies (Joint Working) (Integration Joint Monitoring Committees) (Scotland) Order 2014 (S.S.I. 2014 No. 281)
The Public Bodies (Joint Working) (Local Authority Officers) (Scotland) Regulations 2014 (S.S.I. 2014 No. 282)
The Public Bodies (Joint Working) (Prescribed Consultees) (Scotland) Regulations 2014 (S.S.I. 2014 No. 283)
The Public Bodies (Joint Working) (Prescribed Days) (Scotland) Regulations 2014 (S.S.I. 2014 No. 284)
The Public Bodies (Joint Working) (Integration Joint Boards) (Scotland) Order 2014 (S.S.I. 2014 No. 285)
The A82 Trunk Road (Pulpit Rock Improvement) (Temporary Prohibition of Traffic and Overtaking and Speed Restriction) (No. 2) Order 2014 (S.S.I. 2014 No. 286)
The Marriage and Civil Partnership (Scotland) Act 2014 (Commencement No. 3, Saving, Transitional Provision and Revocation) Order 2014 (S.S.I. 2014 No. 287 (C. 28))
The A83 Trunk Road (Lochgilphead) (Temporary Prohibition On Use of Road) Order 2014 (S.S.I. 2014 No. 288)
The Products Containing Meat etc. (Scotland) Regulations 2014 (S.S.I. 2014 No. 289)
The Common Financial Tool etc. (Scotland) Regulations 2014 (S.S.I. 2014 No. 290)
Act of Sederunt (Rules of the Court of Session and Sheriff Court Rules Amendment No. 2) (Miscellaneous) 2014 (S.S.I. 2014 No. 291)
The Teachers’ Pension Scheme (Scotland) (No. 2) Regulations 2014 (S.S.I. 2014 No. 292)
The Bankruptcy and Debt Advice (Scotland) Act 2014 (Consequential Provisions) Order 2014 (S.S.I. 2014 No. 293)
The Debt Arrangement Scheme (Scotland) Amendment Regulations 2014 (S.S.I. 2014 No. 294)
The Charities Accounts (Scotland) Amendment Regulations 2014 (S.S.I. 2014 No. 295)
The Bankruptcy (Money Advice and Deduction from Income etc.) (Scotland) Regulations 2014 (S.S.I. 2014 No. 296)
The South Arran Marine Conservation (Amendment) Order 2014 (S.S.I. 2014 No. 297)
The Discretionary Housing Payments (Limit on Total Expenditure) Revocation (Scotland) Order 2014 (S.S.I. 2014 No. 298)
The A92/A972 Trunk Road (B969 Western Avenue to the C49 leading to Star) (Temporary Prohibition of Specified Turns) (No. 2) Order 2014 (S.S.I. 2014 No. 299)
The Town and Country Planning (General Permitted Development) (Scotland) Amendment (No. 2) Order 2014 (S.S.I. 2014 No. 300)

301-400
The Town and Country Planning (Fees for Applications and Deemed Applications) (Scotland) Amendment (No. 2) Regulations 2014 (S.S.I. 2014 No. 301)
Act of Sederunt (Rules of the Court of Session and Sheriff Court Rules Amendment No. 2) (Marriage and Civil Partnership (Scotland) Act 2014) 2014 (S.S.I. 2014 No. 302)
The Civil Partnership (Prescribed Bodies) (Scotland) Regulations 2014 (S.S.I. 2014 No. 303)
The Marriage Between Persons of Different Sexes (Prescribed Bodies) (Scotland) Regulations 2014 (S.S.I. 2014 No. 304)
The Same Sex Marriage (Prescribed Bodies) (Scotland) Regulations 2014 (S.S.I. 2014 No. 305)
The Marriage and Civil Partnership (Prescribed Forms) (Scotland) Regulations 2014 (S.S.I. 2014 No. 306)
The Public Bodies (Joint Working) (Health Professionals and Social Care Professionals) (Scotland) Regulations 2014 (S.S.I. 2014 No. 307)
The Public Bodies (Joint Working) (Membership of Strategic Planning Group) (Scotland) Regulations 2014 (S.S.I. 2014 No. 308)
The A82 Trunk Road (Glen Gloy Realignment) (Trunking and Detrunking) Order 2014 (S.S.I. 2014 No. 309)
The Looked After Children (Scotland) Amendment Regulations 2014 (S.S.I. 2014 No. 310)
The A82 Trunk Road (Glen Gloy Realignment) (Side Roads) Order 2014 (S.S.I. 2014 No. 311)
The Food Information (Scotland) Regulations 2014 (S.S.I. 2014 No. 312)
The Notice of Potential Liability for Costs (Discharge Notice) (Scotland) Order 2014 (S.S.I. 2014 No. 313)
The Children and Young People (Scotland) Act 2014 (Commencement No. 4) Order 2014 (S.S.I. 2014 No. 314 (C. 29))
The Children and Young People (Scotland) Act 2014 (Ancillary Provision) (No. 2) Order 2014 (S.S.I. 2014 No. 315)
The Smoke Control Areas (Exempted Fireplaces) (Scotland) Order 2014 (S.S.I. 2014 No. 316)
The Smoke Control Areas (Authorised Fuels) (Scotland) Regulations 2014 (S.S.I. 2014 No. 317)
The Education (Disapplication of section 53B) (Scotland) Regulations 2014 (S.S.I. 2014 No. 318)
The Environmental Regulation (Relevant Offences) (Scotland) Order 2014 (S.S.I. 2014 No. 319)
The Controlled Waste (Fixed Penalty Notices) (Scotland) Order 2014 (S.S.I. 2014 No. 320)
The Litter (Fixed Penalty Notices) (Scotland) Order 2014 (S.S.I. 2014 No. 321)
The Mutual Recognition of Criminal Financial Penalties in the European Union (Scotland) (No. 1) Order 2014 (revoked) (S.S.I. 2014 No. 322)
The Environmental Regulation (Liability where Activity Carried Out by Arrangement with Another) (Scotland) Order 2014 (S.S.I. 2014 No. 323)
The Environmental Regulation (Significant Environmental Harm) (Scotland) Order 2014 (S.S.I. 2014 No. 324)
The Common Agricultural Policy (Cross-Compliance) (Scotland) Regulations 2014 (S.S.I. 2014 No. 325)
The Public Bodies (Joint Working) (Content of Performance Reports) (Scotland) Regulations 2014 (S.S.I. 2014 No. 326)
The Conservation of Salmon (Annual Close Time and Catch and Release) (Scotland) Regulations 2014 (S.S.I. 2014 No. 327)
The Road Traffic Act 1988 (Prescribed Limit) (Scotland) Regulations 2014 (S.S.I. 2014 No. 328)
The South East Scotland Trunk Roads (Temporary Prohibitions of Traffic and Overtaking and Temporary Speed Restrictions) (No. 11) Order 2014 (S.S.I. 2014 No. 329)
The North West Scotland Trunk Roads (Temporary Prohibitions of Traffic and Overtaking and Temporary Speed Restrictions) (No. 11) Order 2014 (S.S.I. 2014 No. 330)
The North East Scotland Trunk Roads (Temporary Prohibitions of Traffic and Overtaking and Temporary Speed Restrictions) (No. 11) Order 2014 (S.S.I. 2014 No. 331)
The South West Scotland Trunk Roads (Temporary Prohibitions of Traffic and Overtaking and Temporary Speed Restrictions) (No. 11) Order 2014 (S.S.I. 2014 No. 332)
The Civil Jurisdiction and Judgments (Protection Measures) (Scotland) Regulations 2014 (S.S.I. 2014 No. 333)
Not Allocated (S.S.I. 2014 No. 334)
The Charities Accounts (Scotland) Amendment (No. 2) Regulations 2014 (S.S.I. 2014 No. 335)
The Mutual Recognition of Criminal Financial Penalties in the European Union (Scotland) (No. 2) Order 2014 (revoked) (S.S.I. 2014 No. 336)
The Mutual Recognition of Supervision Measures in the European Union (Scotland) Regulations 2014 (revoked) (S.S.I. 2014 No. 337)
The Plant Health (Import Inspection Fees) (Scotland) Regulations 2014 (S.S.I. 2014 No. 338)
The Regulation of Investigatory Powers (Authorisation of Covert Human Intelligence Sources) (Scotland) Order 2014 (S.S.I. 2014 No. 339)
The M9/A9 Trunk Road (Munlochy Junction) (Temporary Prohibition of Specified Turns) Order 2014 (S.S.I. 2014 No. 340)
The Public Bodies (Joint Working) (Integration Scheme) (Scotland) Regulations 2014 (S.S.I. 2014 No. 341)
The Public Bodies (Joint Working) (Scotland) Act 2014 (Modifications) Order 2014 (S.S.I. 2014 No. 342)
The Public Bodies (Joint Working) (National Health and Wellbeing Outcomes) (Scotland) Regulations 2014 (S.S.I. 2014 No. 343)
The Public Bodies (Joint Working) (Prescribed Health Board Functions) (Scotland) Regulations 2014 (S.S.I. 2014 No. 344)
The Public Bodies (Joint Working) (Prescribed Local Authority Functions etc.) (Scotland) Regulations 2014 (S.S.I. 2014 No. 345)
The Land Registration etc. (Scotland) Act 2012 (Amendment and Transitional) Order 2014 (S.S.I. 2014 No. 346)
The Land Register of Scotland (Automated Registration) etc. Regulations 2014 (S.S.I. 2014 No. 347)
The Reservoirs (Scotland) Act 2011 (Commencement No. 1) Order 2014 (S.S.I. 2014 No. 348 (C. 30))
Act of Adjournal (Criminal Procedure Rules Amendment No. 2) (Miscellaneous) 2014 (S.S.I. 2014 No. 349)
The Land and Buildings Transaction Tax (Prescribed Proportions) (Scotland) Order 2014 (S.S.I. 2014 No. 350)
The Land and Buildings Transaction Tax (Qualifying Public or Educational Bodies) (Scotland) Amendment Order 2014 (S.S.I. 2014 No. 351)
The Land and Buildings Transaction Tax (Definition of Charity) (Relevant Territories) (Scotland) Regulations 2014 (S.S.I. 2014 No. 352)
The Children and Young People (Scotland) Act 2014 (Commencement No. 5 and Saving Provision) Order 2014 (S.S.I. 2014 No. 353 (C. 31))
The Freedom of Information (Scotland) Act 2002 (Scottish Public Authorities) Amendment Order 2014 (S.S.I. 2014 No. 354)
The Scottish Tax Tribunals (Eligibility for Appointment) Regulations 2014 (S.S.I. 2014 No. 355)
The Glasgow Commonwealth Games Act 2008 (Repeal Day) Order 2014 (S.S.I. 2014 No. 356)
The Conservation of Salmon (Annual Close Time and Catch and Release) (Scotland) Amendment Regulations 2014 (S.S.I. 2014 No. 357)
Not Allocated (S.S.I. 2014 No. 358)
The Victims and Witnesses (Scotland) Act 2014 (Commencement No. 3 and Transitional Provision) Order 2014 (S.S.I. 2014 No. 359 (C. 32))
The Victims and Witnesses (Scotland) Act 2014 (Prescribed Relatives) Order 2014 (S.S.I. 2014 No. 360)
The Marriage Between Civil Partners (Procedure for Change and Fees) (Scotland) Regulations 2014 (S.S.I. 2014 No. 361)
The Marriage (Same Sex Couples) (Jurisdiction and Recognition of Judgments) (Scotland) Regulations 2014 (revoked) (S.S.I. 2014 No. 362)
The Budget (Scotland) Act 2014 Amendment Order 2014 (S.S.I. 2014 No. 363)
The Public Water Supplies (Scotland) Regulations 2014 (S.S.I. 2014 No. 364)
The Children and Young People (Scotland) Act 2014 (Commencement No. 6) Order 2014 (S.S.I. 2014 No. 365 (C. 33))
The Criminal Legal Aid (Fixed Payments and Assistance by Way of Representation) (Scotland) (Miscellaneous Amendments) Regulations 2014 (S.S.I. 2014 No. 366)
The Scottish Landfill Tax (Prescribed Landfill Site Activities) Order 2014 (S.S.I. 2014 No. 367)
The Historic Environment Scotland Act 2014 (Commencement No. 1) Order 2014 (S.S.I. 2014 No. 368 (C. 34))
The Building (Scotland) Act 2003 (Charging Orders) Regulations 2014 (S.S.I. 2014 No. 369)
The Revenue Scotland and Tax Powers Act 2014 (Commencement No. 2) Order 2014 (S.S.I. 2014 No. 370 (C. 35))
Act of Sederunt (Rules of the Court of Session and Sheriff Court Rules Amendment No. 3) (Mutual Recognition of Protection Measures) 2014 (S.S.I. 2014 No. 371)
The Children (Performances and Activities) (Scotland) Regulations 2014 (S.S.I. 2014 No. 372)
The Designation of Nitrate Vulnerable Zones (Scotland) Regulations 2014 (revoked) (S.S.I. 2014 No. 373)
The Sports Grounds and Sporting Events (Designation) (Scotland) Amendment Order 2014 (S.S.I. 2014 No. 374)
The Land and Buildings Transaction Tax (Administration) (Scotland) Regulations 2014 (S.S.I. 2014 No. 375)
The Land and Buildings Transaction Tax (Ancillary Provision) (Scotland) Order 2014 (S.S.I. 2014 No. 376)
The Land and Buildings Transaction Tax (Transitional Provisions) (Scotland) Order 2014 (S.S.I. 2014 No. 377)
The A90 Trunk Road (Cortes) (Prohibition of Waiting) Order 2014 (S.S.I. 2014 No. 378)
The Sea Fishing (Points for Masters of Fishing Boats) (Scotland) Regulations 2014 (S.S.I. 2014 No. 379)
The A85 Trunk Road (Comrie) (Temporary Prohibition On Use of Road) Order 2014 (S.S.I. 2014 No. 380)
The North East Scotland Trunk Roads (Temporary Prohibitions of Traffic and Overtaking and Temporary Speed Restrictions) (No. 12) Order 2014 (S.S.I. 2014 No. 381)
The North West Scotland Trunk Roads (Temporary Prohibitions of Traffic and Overtaking and Temporary Speed Restrictions) (No. 12) Order 2014 (S.S.I. 2014 No. 382)
The South East Scotland Trunk Roads (Temporary Prohibitions of Traffic and Overtaking and Temporary Speed Restrictions) (No. 12) Order 2014 (S.S.I. 2014 No. 383)
The South West Scotland Trunk Roads (Temporary Prohibitions of Traffic and Overtaking and Temporary Speed Restrictions) (No. 12) Order 2014 (S.S.I. 2014 No. 384)
The A82 Trunk Road (Crianlarich Bypass) (Temporary 30mph Speed Restriction) Order 2014 (S.S.I. 2014 No. 385)

References 

2014
Statutory Instruments
Scotland Statutory Instruments